Merwin Mitterwallner (July 4, 1897 – December 1, 1974), sometimes known as Bubbles Mitterwallner, was an American football player.  Mitterwallner was born in Trumansburg, New York.  He played college football at the guard position at both the University of Denver and the University of Illinois.  While playing for Illinois, he was a key blocker for Red Grange and was selected by Herbert Reed as a first-team player on the 1925 College Football All-America Team. He also received third-team All-American honors from the International News Service and the Chicago Daily News.

References

1897 births
1974 deaths
American football guards
Denver Pioneers football players
Illinois Fighting Illini football players
People from Tompkins County, New York
Players of American football from New York (state)